The coat of arms of the Kingdom of the Netherlands was originally adopted in 1815 and later modified in 1907. The arms are a composite of the arms of the former Dutch Republic and the arms of the House of Nassau, it features a checkered shield with a lion grasping a sword in one hand and a bundle of arrows in the other and is the heraldic symbol of the monarch (King Willem-Alexander) and the country. The monarch uses a version of the arms with a mantle while the government of the Netherlands uses a smaller version without the mantle (cloak) or the pavilion, sometimes only the shield and crown are used. The components of the coats of arms were regulated by Queen Wilhelmina in a royal decree of 10 July 1907, affirmed by Queen Juliana in a royal decree of 23 April 1980.

Description
The blazon is as follows:

Azure, billetty Or a lion with a coronet Or armed and langued Gules holding in his dexter paw a sword Argent hilted Or and in the sinister paw seven arrows Argent pointed and bound together Or. (The seven arrows stand for the seven provinces of the Union of Utrecht.) The shield is crowned with the (Dutch) royal crown and supported by two lions Or armed and langued gules. They stand on a scroll Azure with the text (Or) "Je Maintiendrai" (French for "I shall maintain".)

The monarch places this coat of arms on a mantle gules lined with ermine. Above the mantle is a pavilion gules again topped with the royal crown.

In the royal decree, it is stated that male successors may replace the crown on the shield with a helm with the crest of Nassau.

History and origin of the coat of arms
This version of the coat of arms has been in use since 1907 but differs only slightly from the version that was adopted in 1815. From 1815 until 1907 all the lions wore the royal crown and the supporting lions were facing.

The royal arms were adopted by the first king of The Kingdom of the Netherlands, William I, when he became king after the Congress of Vienna in 1815. As king, he adopted a coat of arms that combined elements of his family’s (Orange-Nassau) coat of arms and that of the former Dutch Republic that existed from 1581 until 1795.

From his family arms he used the azure, billetty or with a lion rampant or of Nassau (blue shield, lion, billets). The "Je Maintiendrai" motto represents the Orange family since it came into the family with the princedom of Orange as "Je Maintiendrai Châlons". These elements are also found in the arms of king William III, who was also king of England, Scotland & Ireland (1689–1702). From the arms of the former States General of the Republic of the United Provinces he took the lion with a coronet, sword and arrows. The arrows symbolize the seven provinces that made up the Republic, the sword the determination to defend their liberty, and the coronet their sovereignty. William replaced the coronet with a royal crown. In 1907, Queen Wilhelmina returned to an open coronet.

Counts of Nassau
 
The arms of Nassau has existed since about 1250. There are two versions of the Nassau arms, representing the two main branches. This is a result of two brothers, count Walram II and count Otto I, agreeing to divide their father's (Henry II) lands between them in 1255. The line of Walram added a crown to the lion in the Nassau arms to make it different from the lion used by the line of Otto.

The kings and queens of the Netherlands are descendants of count Otto. The Grand Dukes of Luxemburg are descendants of count Walram. They also still use "Nassau" in their arms. Both lines are now extinct in the male line.

The helm and crest that can be used in the Royal arms by the male successors to the throne (and is in fact being used by some male members of the Royal Family) is:
"On a (ceremonial) helmet, with bars and decoration Or and mantling Azure and Or, issuing from a coronet Or, a pair of wings joined Sable each with an arched bend Argent charged with three leaves of the lime-tree stems upward Vert".

This crest is used by the descendants of Otto and differs from the crest used by the descendants of Walram. But in the royal decree of 1815 the crest issuing from a crown on the Dutch Royal Arms was the one used by the Walram line. Why this was done is not sure. Maybe due to the "mistake" this crest was hardly used.

The crest of the Walram-line is:
Between two trunks Azure billetty Or a sitting lion Or.
The trunks are probably a misinterpretation of two cow horns, a crest that is frequently used in German heraldry.
On the Grand Coat of Arms of the Grand Duke of Luxemburg the lion is crowned, armed and langued Gules.

The Princedom of Orange
The motto has been used by every "ruling" member of the Nassau family, who was also the prince of Orange since it came into the family with the Princedom of Orange in 1530. Count Henry III of Nassau-Breda, who was living in the Low Countries, was married to Claudia Orange-Châlon. Her brother, Philibert of Châlon, was the last Prince of Orange from the House of Châlon. When he died in 1530, Henry's and Claudia's son René of Nassau-Breda inherited the Princedom on condition that he used the name and coat of arms of the Châlon family. History knows him therefore as René of Châlon. With this inheritance came the "Je Maintiendrai Châlons" motto into the Nassau family. René died in 1544 without leaving a child. His cousin William of Nassau-Dillenburg inherited all of René's lands. William became William of Orange (in English better known under his nickname William the Silent) and the founder of the House of Orange-Nassau. William first changed the motto to "Je Maintiendrai Nassau". Later he (or his sons) dropped the family name from the motto.

The Dutch Republic

The sword and arrows originated from the Habsburg rulers.

The lion, as representing the Burgundian Netherlands, first appears as a crest on the tomb of Philip the Handsome. Later Charles V added the sword. The arrows were used, on coins etc.,  since the early 16th century to represent the Seventeen Provinces in the low countries under control of Charles V.  In 1578, during the Eighty Years' War, the States General ordered a new great seal representing the lion, the sword and the 17 arrows combined. Although only seven provinces remained free from Spain, this seal stayed in use until 1795.

After the completion of its forming in 1584 the Republic of the Seven United Provinces used as its arms: Or a crowned lion Gules armed and langued Azure, holding in his dexter paw a sword and in the sinister paw seven arrows tight together Azure. The colours of this version where derived from the most important of the seven provinces, the county of Holland (its arms are still in use since being adopted by the counts of Holland c. 1198).

After c. 1668 the colours where reversed and the arms became Gules a crowned lion Or armed and langued Azure holding in his dexter paw a sword Argent hilted Or and in the sinister paw seven arrows Argent pointed and tight together Or.

The arrows symbolize the seven provinces that made up the Republic, the sword the determination to defend their liberty, and the coronet their sovereignty.

1795–1815 Revolution, Napoleonic years and Restoration

In 1795, with French help, the last Stadholder William V was forced to flee and the Batavian Republic (1795–1806) was proclaimed. At first this had no influence on the use of the arms of the former Republic. Then in the following year the lion, that had served for approximately 280 years, was replaced by an allegoric image of a “Dutch maiden of Freedom”. In 1802 the Batavian Republic reverted to the Republican lion, although it doesn't carrying seven arrows.

The replacement of the Batavian Republic with the Kingdom of Holland (1806–1810) was again adopted the lion of the States General. Louis Napoleon Bonaparte (brother of the French Emperor Napoleon) used as King Louis I a coat of arms that quartered the Dutch lion with the French Imperial Eagle. After the emperor Napoleon abolished the Kingdom of Holland in 1810 the lion again had to leave the stage and the Imperial Eagle was the only image in use.

In 1813 the French were forced out of the Netherlands and the son of the last Stadholder, William VI / I was proclaimed 'Sovereign Prince' (1813–1815). To symbolize his new status he assumed a new coat of arms. In it the old lion with the sword and arrows made his second reappearance, now with a Royal crown upon his head. Again it was placed in de prime locations of a quartered shield (I and IV quarter).  In the II and III quarter where the arms of Châlon-Orange-Geneve, the arms of Nassau (Otto) where placed on an escutcheon in the center of the shield.

The final retirement of the Republican lion came in 1815 with the establishment of the “United Kingdom of the Netherlands”. Because this new kingdom comprised not only of the lands of the former Dutch Republic but also of the former Austrian or Southern Netherlands it was also not appropriate to continue the use of the old arms. First a combination with the arms of Brabant (Sable a Lion Or, now the coat of arms of Belgium) was considered. In the end the attributes, the sword, arrows and crown, were placed in the care of his older “colleague” from Nassau to symbolize the union between the (now Royal) House of Nassau and the Netherlands. As seen above, this is still the basis of the current coat of arms.

Versions and variants

Government

Various versions of the Dutch Royal Arms are used by Government, the Parliament and courts. Government and its agencies generally use a simplified version of the Royal Arms without the mantle, the pavilion and the topped royal crown. This simplified Royal Arms also feature on the cover of passports, embassies and consulates. The versions used by the Legislature and its chambers shown the Royal Arms with the Royal Crown and a buckled dark-blue strap that bears the name of the Parliament or each chamber Staten-Generaal (States General), Eerste Kamer der Staten-Generaal (Senate), Tweede Kamer der Staten-Generaal (House of Representatives) in gold letters surrounding the shield.

Royal Family
Members of the Dutch Royal Family receive their own personalised arms which are based on the Royal Arms.  For more details see Wapen van Nassau, Tak van Otto (in Dutch).

See also 
Coats of arms of provinces of the Netherlands
Dutch Republic Lion

References

External links

Rijkswapen en Koninklijk wapen  Webpage on the High Council of Nobility's official website

 
Dutch monarchy
Netherlands
Netherlands
National symbols of the Netherlands
Netherlands
Netherlands
Netherlands